Arachchige Sarath Kumara Gunarathne is a Sri Lankan politician, a member of the Parliament of Sri Lanka and a government minister. He is the Negombo MP from Gampaha district and is a long-standing member of the Sri Lanka Freedom Party (SLFP). Prior to his current appointment as the Deputy Minister of Fisheries, he has been appointed deputy minister for state resources, and as deputy minister of aviation. He is currently the acting minister of Fisheries and Aquatic resources following the defection of former Fisheries Minister Rajitha Senaratne to the opposition. minister Sarath Kumara Gunaratne, arrested by the CID on charges of misappropriating Rs.12 million belonging the Negombo Fisheries Harbour Corporation, was today remanded till January 9 by Colombo Chief Magistrate Lal Bandara.

Sarath Kumara Gunaratna was born in Dungalpitiya, a village close to Negombo. His father was a local school principal. Mr Gunaratna first contested the Negombo seat in 1989, but was not able to get the required preferential votes to get elected. After a stint overseas in Italy, Mr. Gunarathne returned to Sri Lanka to enter active politics. He contested the 1999 Provincial council election representing the Wattala seat and entered the Western Provincial Council. In 2006, he entered Parliament as a 'next in line' MP when one MP resigned due to illness. He was elected in 2010 general election as an MP from the Gampaha district under the ruling UPFA coalition.

Mr Gunaratne describes his politics as progressive and people-oriented.

References
 
https://www.youtube.com/watch?time_continue=5&v=lfIJpx8oRzM&feature=emb_logo

Year of birth missing (living people)
Living people
Members of the 13th Parliament of Sri Lanka
Members of the 14th Parliament of Sri Lanka
Government ministers of Sri Lanka
Sri Lanka Freedom Party politicians
United People's Freedom Alliance politicians
Sri Lankan Roman Catholics